Mikuláš Fried (1906–1944), was a male international table tennis player from Czechoslovakia.

He won a bronze medal at the 1930 World Table Tennis Championships in the men's team event.

He was of Jewish origin and was one of a number of Czech players to have died in concentration camps.

See also
 List of table tennis players
 List of World Table Tennis Championships medalists

References

Czechoslovak table tennis players
Jewish table tennis players
1906 births
1944 deaths
World Table Tennis Championships medalists
Czech people who died in Nazi concentration camps
Czech Jews who died in the Holocaust